Novy Usur is a rural locality (a selo) in Lutkunsky Selsoviet, Akhtynsky District, Republic of Dagestan, Russia. The population was 910 as of 2010. There are 4 streets.

Geography
Novy Usur is located 74 km northeast of Akhty (the district's administrative centre) by road. Gogaz is the nearest rural locality.

References 

Rural localities in Akhtynsky District